This article details the results of Elections to Preston City Council held in May 2003

Preston Council is elected "in thirds", which means in 2002 the entire council was up for election and in subsequent years one councillor from the three-member wards and one councillor from selected two-member wards defend their seat. In these result tables, the share of the vote is blank as the 2002 elections cannot be fairly compared. Any gain or loss can be recorded as each year the councillors are defending their ward results.

For more results see Preston local elections

Ward Results

Ashton

Brookfield

College

Deepdale

Garrison

Greyfriars

Ingol

Larches

Lea

Moor Park

Preston Rural East

Ribbleton

Riversway

Sharoe Green

St George's

St Matthew's

Town Centre

Tulketh

University

References
2003 Preston election result
Ward results

See also
Preston local elections
City of Preston, Lancashire
Fulwood, Lancashire
Lea, Lancashire
Preston (UK Parliament constituency)

2003 English local elections
2003
2000s in Lancashire